The list of shipwrecks in 1900 includes ships sunk, foundered, grounded, or otherwise lost during 1900.

January

1 January

2 January

3 January

4 January

5 January

6 January

7 January

8 January

16 January

18 January

20 January

23 January

25 January

26 January

27 January

28 January

29 January

31 January

Unknown date

February

3 February

4 February

5 February

6 February

7 February

8 February

9 February

10 February

12 February

16 February

17 February

19 February

20 February

23 February

24 February

25 February

27 February

28 February

Unknown date

March

1 March

5 March

6 March

8 March

9 March

10 March

12 March

14 March

16 March

19 March

21 March

22 March

23 March

25 March

26 March

27 March

Unknown date

April

1 April

2 April

3 April

4 April

6 April

7 April

10 April

11 April

15 April

16 April

20 April

29 April

Unknown date

May

1 May

3 May

4 May

5 May

9 May

17 May

19 May

22 May

Unknown date

June

4 June

6 June

7 June

10 June

11 June

 Nelly was famous for setting precedent for maritime law in the sale of minority interest in a ship (The Nelly Schneider, Admiralty, April 4 and 5, 1878, Sir R. Phillimore).

15 June

16 June

18 June

23 June

29 June

30 June

July

1 July

6 July

7 July

9 July

11 July

16 July

17 July

18 July

21 July

26 July

27 July

28 July

29 July

30 July

Unknown date

August

1 August

3 August

5 August

9 August

10 August

11 August

12 August

13 August

14 August

15 August

16 August

17 August

19 August

22 August

23 August

24 August

31 August

Unknown date

September

1 September

3 September

4 September

6 September

7 September

8 September

9 September

11 September

12 September

14 September

15 September

17 September

18 September

20 September

21 September

22 September

24 September

26 September

27 September

30 September

Unknown date

October

1 October

2 October

5 October

6 October

7 October

10 October

12 October

15 October

16 October

17 October

18 October

20 October

22 October

23 October

24 October

26 October

28 October

29 October

31 October

Unknown date

November

1 November

2 November

3 November

7 November

9 November

13 November

16 November

17 November

21 November

23 November

24 November

28 November

29 November

30 November

Unknown date

December

2 December

4 December

6 December

7 December

8 December

9 December

10 December

12 December

13 December

16 December

17 December

18 December

20 December

21 December

22 December

23 December

24 December

28 December

29 December

30 December

Unknown date

Unknown date

References

1900
 
1900-related lists